Klaas de Vries (11 November 1917 – 21 August 1999) was a Dutch politician.

References

External links
 Parliamentary Biography

1917 births
1999 deaths
20th-century Dutch politicians
Christian Democratic Appeal politicians
Christian Historical Union politicians
Dutch civil servants
Dutch educators
Dutch members of the Dutch Reformed Church
Dutch resistance members
Members of the Senate (Netherlands)
People from Bolsward
Royal Netherlands Army personnel
University of Groningen alumni
Dutch people of the Indonesian National Revolution